Phoenix Marketcity is a shopping mall developed by The Phoenix Mills Co. Ltd., located in Bengaluru, Karnataka, India.

Accidents and incidents

On 28 October 2013, the PVR multiplex along with 54 other shops in the mall were sealed for not having obtained trade licenses from the Bruhat Bangalore Mahanagara Palike, but later reopened.

On 18 May 2016, Phoenix Mall was raided along with other malls in the city, on a tip-off that they were ignoring the ban on plastic bags.

See also

Phoenix Marketcity (Mumbai)
Phoenix Marketcity (Chennai)
High Street Phoenix
List of shopping malls in India
List of shopping malls in Bangalore

References 

Shopping malls in Bangalore
2011 establishments in Karnataka
Shopping malls established in 2011